Keith Steven Gilbertson Jr. (born May 15, 1948) is a retired American football coach and player.  He was the head coach at the University of Idaho (1986–1988), the University of California, Berkeley (1992–1995), and the University of Washington (2003–2004), compiling a career college football record of 55–51. Gilbertson retired in 2011 as a coach.

Early life and playing career
The son of a high school football coach, Gilbertson grew up in Snohomish, Washington, northeast of Seattle. He graduated from Snohomish High School in 1966 and attended Central Washington University in Ellensburg, Columbia Basin College, the University of Hawaii, and returned to Central Washington, where he received a bachelor's degree in social sciences in 1971. He later earned a degree in education from Western Washington University in 1974.

Coaching career
After three stints as a graduate assistant, Gilbertson became an offensive coordinator in 1977 at Utah State under head coach Bruce Snyder.  After five seasons in Logan, he joined Dennis Erickson's new staff at Idaho, who immediately turned the Vandal program around in 1982, going 8–3 in the regular season and advancing to the quarterfinals of the I-AA playoffs. Shortly after, Gilbertson departed for the Los Angeles Express of the newly-formed USFL, where he coached as offensive coordinator for three spring seasons. Following the demise of the league, Gilbertson returned to Idaho in 1985, and the Vandals won their first Big Sky Conference title in fourteen years.

Erickson departed for Wyoming in December, and Gilbertson was promoted to head coach of the Vandal program. His  record in conference play was the best-ever in the Big Sky.

Following consecutive conference championships and advancing to the Division I-AA semifinals, Gilbertson interviewed at UTEP in December 1988 but withdrew from consideration. Days later he accepted an offer to coach the offensive line in the Pac-10 at Washington in Seattle under head coach Don James and offensive coordinator Gary Pinkel. The compensation was similar to his Idaho salary, about $55,000; Gilbertson replaced Dan Dorazio on the UW staff. (After three wins to start the 1988 season, the Huskies finished 6–5 and 3–5 in conference, with losses to USC, UCLA, Oregon, Arizona, and WSU.) Gilbertson's three-year stint concluded with the undefeated 1991 national championship team, for which he was also offensive coordinator.

Two weeks after winning the Rose Bowl, Gilbertson became the head coach at California in January 1992. Despite leading Cal to a 9–4 record in 1993 with a decisive victory in the Alamo Bowl, he was dismissed after his fourth season when the 1995 Bears went 3–8. Gilbertson's overall record at Cal was 

After Cal, he was an assistant coach for the NFL's Seattle Seahawks for three seasons (1996–98) under Erickson; the last two years as tight ends coach.  In 1999, he returned to the Washington Huskies as an assistant head coach under new head coach Rick Neuheisel.
 
Gilbertson became the head coach at Washington in 2003 following the abrupt summer dismissal of Neuheisel. His first season was fairly respectable at 6–6; only a blowout loss to Cal in the next-to-last game of the season kept the Huskies out of a bowl game. The bottom fell out a year later, in which the Huskies finished 1–10, including only their second winless PCC/Big Five/Pac-8/Pac-10 record in peacetime. He then returned to the Seahawks as an assistant under Mike Holmgren.

Head coaching record

College

References

1948 births
Living people
California Golden Bears football coaches
Hawaii Rainbow Warriors football players
Idaho State Bengals football coaches
Idaho Vandals football coaches
People from Snohomish, Washington
Seattle Seahawks coaches
United States Football League coaches
Utah State Aggies football coaches
Washington Huskies football coaches
Western Washington Vikings football coaches
Players of American football from Washington (state)